Tošković (Cyrillic: Тошковић or Тошкович) is a Montenegrin surname that may refer to the following notable people:
Anđela Tošković (born 2004), Montenegrin football midfielder
Jasna Tošković (born 1989), Montenegrin handball player
Jovan Tošković (1893–1943), Montenegrin Serb historian, professor and politician
Nikola Toshkovich (1831–1893), Bulgarian engineer
Uroš Tošković (1932–2019), Montenegrin and Yugoslav painter and draftsman
Vučeta Tošković (born 1941), politician in Serbia

Montenegrin surnames